Brian Victor Snowdon (listed in some sources as Brian Snowden and also as Bryan, born 1 January 1935) is an English professional footballer who played in the Football League for Blackpool, Portsmouth, Millwall and Crystal Palace as a defender. He also played non-league football for Margate and Brentwood and had a spell towards the end of his career with Detroit Cougars.

Career
Snowdon was born in Bishop Auckland and began his youth career with Bishop Auckland BC before signing for Blackpool of the First Division in 1955. Between then and 1960 he made 18 appearances scoring the only goal of his senior professional career. In 1960, he moved to Portsmouth who had just been relegated from the First Division. At Portsmouth, his first-team opportunities improved, making 114 league appearances over the next four seasons but without scoring. In 1964, he moved to Millwall, making 128 appearances in 3 years and captaining the side in two promotion seasons before moving into non-league football with Margate, in 1967. At Margate he was made club captain, despite being on a short-term contract due to an already impending move to Detroit Cougars which took place in December 1967.

He then spent a year with Detroit Cougars making 27 appearances in the 1968 season before returning to the UK, signing a short-term contract with Crystal Palace in February 1969. He made five appearances (four as a substitute) in the latter half of the 1968–69 season at the end of which Palace won promotion to the top tier for the first time. He was released at the end of the season, returning to non-league football with Brentwood. He subsequently played for Chelmsford City, in 1970–71, after they merged with Brentwood.

Personal life
Outside of football, Snowdon worked as a PE teacher and also ran a service station.

References

External links

Snowdon at holmesdale.net
Snowdon at pompeyrama.com

1935 births
Sportspeople from Bishop Auckland
Footballers from County Durham
English Football League players
Association football defenders
Blackpool F.C. players
Portsmouth F.C. players
Millwall F.C. players
Margate F.C. players
Crystal Palace F.C. players
Detroit Cougars (soccer) players
Brentwood Town F.C. players
Chelmsford City F.C. players
North American Soccer Football League players
English expatriate footballers
Expatriate soccer players in the United States
English footballers
English expatriates in the United States
Living people